Brian Vahaly (born July 19, 1979) is an American former professional tennis player and a graduate of University of Virginia. He reached the quarterfinals of the 2003 Indian Wells Masters (defeating world no. 1 Juan Carlos Ferrero en route) and achieved a career-high of world no. 57 in March 2003.

Early career
He began playing tennis at the age of two with his parents Barry and Karen. As a junior, Brian Vahaly captured the Easter Bowl 18s title and reached the final of the Coffee Bowl in Costa Rica in 1997. His best junior Grand Slam result was reaching the quarterfinal at Wimbledon that same year, where he finished 17th in the world junior rankings.

Vahaly proceeded to play four years of collegiate tennis at the University of Virginia from 1998 to 2001, where he was a three-time All-American and finished as the school's most successful player. In 2000, he won the United States Amateur Championships (Men's Tennis). In 2001, Vahaly reached the singles final at the NCAA Championships, and lost in the doubles semifinal with Huntley Montgomery, but finished as the no. 1 player in doubles and no. 5 in singles (40-6).

Vahaly became UVA's first tennis All-American in 1999 and during the previous season was named the Atlantic Coast Conference Rookie of Year. In his last two seasons, he was a two-time ACC Player of Year, and as a senior, he was named the University of Virginia Male Athlete of Year. He graduated with two majors in Finance and Business Management, and finished his career at Virginia as an Academic All-American. He was inducted into the Hall of Fame of University of Virginia Men's Tennis.

Professional career
In 2002, Vahaly enjoyed a breakthrough season on the ATP circuit, advancing to the semifinals of Memphis (falling to Andy Roddick) and the quarterfinals of Indian Wells. He defeated three top 10 ranked players Fernando González, (2003 French Open Champion and former world no. 1) Juan Carlos Ferrero, and Tommy Robredo at Indian Wells and later teamed with Andy Roddick in Washington, D.C., to defeat the no. 1 ranked doubles team of Bob and Mike Bryan. During the year he also posted wins over Michael Chang and Vince Spadea. Vahaly was the only college graduate in the top 100 in the world and was recognized by People magazine in its issue of the 25 Hottest Bachelors. In March 2003, he reached his career high singles ranking of world no. 57.

In 2004-2007, Vahaly spent most of the year on the ATP circuit playing events in Indianapolis, Los Angeles, Newport, Houston, Indian Wells, San Jose, Adelaide, and the Australian Open (losing to finalist Marat Safin).

Vahaly played his last tournament at the U.S. Open losing to Juan Martín del Potro. After the tournament, Vahaly revealed that the shoulder injury had plagued him for some time. On September 7, 2007, Brian underwent surgery to repair several tears to his right rotator cuff. He had two additional surgeries later that year.

Retirement
In November 2007, Vahaly announced his retirement from professional tennis on his website. He had three shoulder surgeries from 2006 to 2007. He moved to Washington, D.C., to work for a private equity fund. In 2013, Vahaly began serving on the USTA board of directors and then became the chief operating officer at two different venture capital firms, Venturehouse Group and NextGen Venture Partners. In 2017, he entered the gym and wellness space to become the CFO of [solidcore], and most recently in 2021, he became the CEO of YouFit Gyms.

Personal life 
Vahaly came out as gay in 2017 in a podcast. He is married to Bill Jones, with whom he is raising two twin boys. He is one of very few out male professional tennis players, and the first gay man to publicly come out after playing on the ATP Tour.

References

External links
 	

TENNIS: U.S. Team Picked For the Davis Cup
Video: Brian Vahaly on CNN International Sport
Pacific Life Open - March 13, 2003
RATCLIFFE ON: Vahaly retires on his own terms
Vahaly establishes unprecedented mark

1979 births
American male tennis players
Living people
Sportspeople from Camden, New Jersey
Tennis people from New Jersey
Virginia Cavaliers men's tennis players
LGBT tennis players
Gay sportsmen
American LGBT sportspeople
21st-century American LGBT people